Following is a list of dams and reservoirs in Wisconsin.

All major dams are linked below.

Dams and reservoirs in Wisconsin

This list is incomplete.  You can help Wikipedia by expanding it.

Lock and Dam No. 3, Mississippi River, United States Army Corps of Engineers (between Wisconsin and Minnesota)
Lock and Dam No. 4, Mississippi River, USACE (between Wisconsin and Minnesota)
Lock and Dam No. 5, Mississippi River, USACE (between Wisconsin and Minnesota)
Lock and Dam No. 5A, Mississippi River, USACE (between Wisconsin and Minnesota)
Lock and Dam No. 6, Mississippi River, USACE (between Wisconsin and Minnesota)
Lock and Dam No. 7, Lake Onalaska, USACE (between Wisconsin and Minnesota)
Lock and Dam No. 8, Mississippi River, USACE (between Wisconsin and Minnesota)
Lock and Dam No. 9, Lake Winneshiek, USACE (between Wisconsin and Iowa)
Lock and Dam No. 11, Mississippi River, USACE (between Wisconsin and Iowa)
Alexander Dam, Alexander Lake, Wisconsin Public Service Corp.
Altoona 2WP340 Dam, Lake Altoona, Eau Claire County
Arpin Dam, Radisson Flowage on the Chippewa River, Renewable World Energy, LLC
Babcock Park Lock and Dam, Lake Waubesa, Dane County
Big Eau Pleine Dam, Big Eau Pleine Reservoir, Wisconsin Valley Improvement Company
Billy Boy Flowage Dam, 45.84195, -91.40758
Biron Dam, Biron Flowage, NewPage
Caldron Falls Dam, Caldron Falls Reservoir, Wisconsin Public Service Co.
Castle Rock Dam, Castle Rock Lake, Wisconsin River Power Company
Cedar Falls Dam, Tainter Lake, Xcel Energy
Chalk Hills Dam, unnamed reservoir on the Menominee River, Wisconsin Electric Power Co. (between Wisconsin and Michigan)
Chequamegon Waters Dam, 45.20061, -90.71103
Chippewa Lake Dam, 45.88809, -91.07708
Chippewa Falls Dam, unnamed reservoir on the Chippewa River, Xcel Energy
Cornell Dam, Cornell Flowage, Xcel Energy
Chute Pond Dam, Chute Pond, Oconto County
Crowley Flowage Dam, 45.86852, -90.58542
Dell Creek Dam, Lake Delton, Village of Lake Delton
Dexterville Dam, Lake Dexter, Wood County
DuBay Dam, Lake DuBay, NewPage
Eau Claire Dam, Eau Claire Lake, Eau Claire County
Flambeau Flowage Dam, 46.06977, -90.22393
High Falls Dam, High Falls Reservoir, Wisconsin Public Service Co.
Holcombe Dam, Holcombe Flowage, Xcel Energy
Gordon Dam, St. Croix Flowage on the St. Croix River, Douglas County
Grandfather Dam, unnamed reservoir on the Wisconsin River, Wisconsin Public Service Co.
Indianford Dam, Lake Koshkonong, Rock County
Jim Falls Dam, Old Abe Lake, upper overflow dam, 45.06044, -91.2663
Jim Falls Dam, Old Abe Lake on the Chippewa River, lower hydroelectric dam, Xcel Energy, 45.05137, -91.27417
Kilbourn Dam, Dells of the Wisconsin River, Alliant Energy
La Farge Dam (uncompleted), Kickapoo River, USACE
Long Lake Dam (by Nobleton), 45.66708, -91.68125
Long Lake / Jobes Dam (by Phillips), 45.68291, -90.45232
Lake of the Falls Dam, 46.15056, -90.16127
Lower Park Falls Dam, 45.91348, -90.44763
Menasha Genlaws, a portion of Little Lake Butte des Morts, USACE
Menomonie Dam, Lake Menomin, Xcel Energy
Mondeaux Dam, Mondeaux Flowage, Chequamegon-Nicolet National Forest
Mooney Dam, 46.25876, -91.56958  / Lower Eau Claire Lake
Namekagon Dam, 46.22372, -91.148
Neenah Dam, a portion of Little Lake Butte des Morts, Neenah and Menasha Power Co.
Lake Noquebay Dam, Lake Noquebay, Marinette County
Park Falls Dam, 45.93838, -90.44407
Petenwell Dam, Petenwell Lake, Wisconsin River Power Company
Prairie du Sac Dam, Lake Wisconsin, Alliant Energy
Radisson Flowage Dam, 45.76093, -91.2025
Rainbow Dam, Rainbow Flowage, Wisconsin Valley Improvement Company
Rapide Croche Lock and Dam, unnamed reservoir on the Fox River, USACE
Red Cedar / Hemlock Lake Dam, 45.58977, -91.60194
Lake Redstone Dam, Lake Redstone, Sauk County
Rice Lake Dam, 45.49928, -91.73291
Round Lake Logging Dam, South Fork of the Flambeau River, Price County
St. Croix Falls Dam, Indianhead Flowage on the St. Croix River (Wisconsin–Minnesota), Xcel Energy
Sandstone Rapids Dam, Sandstone Reservoir, Wisconsin Public Service Co.
Stone Lake Dam, 45.83244, -91.56426
Sturgeon Falls Dam, unnamed reservoir on the Menominee River, City of Norway, Michigan (between Wisconsin and Michigan)
Tomahawk Dam, Lake Mohawksin on the Wisconsin River, Wisconsin Public Service Co.
Trego Dam, Trego Lake on the Namekagon River, Xcel Energy
Turtle Dam, Turtle-Flambeau Flowage on the North Fork of the Flambeau River, Xcel Energy
Upper Beaver Dam, Beaver Dam Lake (Wisconsin), City of Beaver Dam
Upper Green Lake Dam, Upper Green Lake, City of Green Lake
White Rapids Dam, Rosebush Lake on the Menominee River, Wisconsin Electric Power Co. (between Wisconsin and Michigan)
Winter Dam, Lake Chippewa (Wisconsin) on the Chippewa River, Xcel Energy 
Winter Lake Dam (by Winter), 45.79591, -90.98879  (not the same as previous line)
Wissota Dam, Lake Wissota, Xcel Energy

References 

Wisconsin
Dams
Dams